Lorie Tarshis (22 March 1911 – 4 October 1993) was a Canadian economist who taught mostly at Stanford University.  He is credited with writing the first introductory textbook that brought Keynesian thinking into American university classrooms, the 1947 Elements of Economics. The work swiftly lost popularity after it was charged with excessive sympathy to communism by McCarthyist activists. Instead, the 1948 Economics by Paul Samuelson brought the Keynesian revolution to the United States.

Early life and education 
Tarshis was born in Toronto and received a bachelor's degree from the University of Toronto and master's and doctoral degrees in economics from Trinity College, Cambridge.

Career

Private sector 
He came to the United States in 1936 as an instructor at Tufts University near Boston. He worked for the War Production Board in World War II and then became an operations analyst for the United States Army Air Forces at bomber commands in Libya, Tunisia and Italy.

Teaching 
He began teaching at Stanford in 1946, rising from assistant to associate to full professor.

Tarshis headed the department of economics at Stanford intermittently from 1950 to 1970. He then joined the faculty of Scarborough College, part of the University of Toronto system, and remained there until 1978 as a professor of economics. Until 1988 he was a professor and acting chairman of the department of economics at Glendon College, York University in Ontario.

McCarthyite attack

In The Vital Center (1949), author Arthur M. Schlesinger, Jr. describes the attack on Tarshis:  The most recent textbook witch-hunt provides an edifying example.  In August 1947, on the letterhead of an organization calling itself the National Economic Council, Inc., a man named Merwin K. Hart wrote to every member of the boards of trustees of colleges using Elements of Economics, an economic text written by Professor Lorie Tarshis of Stanford University. An enclosed review denounced the book for its exposition of the doctrines of Lord Keynes and identified Keynseianism as a form of Marxism.    Hart's letter had an immediate effect.  Organizations of small businessmen passed resolutions in his support.  Trusettes and alumni wrote outraged letters to college presidents.  Yet who was Merwin K. Hart?  His record had been long known to students of the American proto-fascist demimonde...    Fortunately enough college presidents knew Hart's record to stand up courageously to the uproar...  The American Economic Association eventually appointed a special committee to deal with the attacks on the Tarshis book and on other economic texts.

Death 
He died in a Toronto nursing home of Parkinson's disease at the age of 82.

Selected bibliography 
  .

References

1911 births
1993 deaths
Canadian economists
University of Toronto alumni
Stanford University Department of Economics faculty
Academic staff of the University of Toronto
People from Toronto
Keynesians
20th-century American economists
Academic staff of Glendon College